Langtang valley is a Himalayan valley in the mountains of north-central Nepal, known for its trekking routes and natural environment.

Administrative 
The Langtang valley lies in the Rasuwa district of the Bagmati Province in Nepal. Situated 80 kilometres north of the Kathmandu Valley, the valley lies within the Langtang national park, which borders the Tibet autonomous region of China. Prior to the 2015 earthquake, 668 individuals are estimated to have lived within the Langtang valley.

Ecology 
The Langtang valley lies within the Langtang National Park. The park contains a wide variety of climatic zones, from subtropical to alpine. Approximately 25% of the park is forested. Trees include the deciduous oak and maple, evergreens like pine, and various types of rhododendron. Animal life includes the Himalayan black bear, Himalayan tahr, Assam macaque, snow leopard, yak, red panda and more than 250 species of birds.

Culture 
Among themselves, the local inhabitants of the Langtang valley refer to each other as 'Langtangpa'. They generally follow Tibetan Buddhism, and speak a Tibetan language that is closely related to the Tibetan spoken in Kyirong, southern Tibet. The Langtangpas regard the mountain Langtang Lirung as their 'yu-lha', their local country god. However, in the state census, the Langtangpas are categorised as Tamang. Langtang valley is believed to be the Beyul Dagam Namgo, one of the many hidden valleys blessed by Guru Padmasambhava.

Economy 
The traditional livelihoods of the Langtangpas have centered around agropastoralism. Since the mid-1970s, tourism has grown to become an important source of livelihoods in the Langtang valley. Swiss cheese-making was introduced in Langtang in the 1950s by Werner Schulthess. Over time, Swiss cheese became a popular product of Langtang, and its production in the valley continues to this day.

Access 
The nearest motorable roadhead for the Langtang valley is Shyaphrubesi, which is also the base for most treks into the Langtang valley. The distance of Shyaphrubesi from Kathmandu is 80km. But due to bad road conditions, it usually takes 6-8 hours to drive from Kathmandu to Shyaphrubesi. Just as for the Langtang National Park, entering the Langtang valley requires everyone except locals to have the TIMS permit and the Langtang National Park entry permit.

Tourism 
The Langtang valley trek, from Shyaphrubesi to Kyanjin Gumba and back, is known to be the third most popular trek in Nepal, after the Annapurna circuit and Everest base camp treks. There are several treks that go through the Langtang valley and link it to nearby valleys, like the Helambu valley. In most of these treks, one can stay at local 'tea-houses', which are run by locals in nearly every village in the valley, and where one gets basic lodging and food. Around 2000, with support of the United Nations Development Programme, some of these were equipped with solar panels so that hikers could shower with warm water. There are several mountain-climbing options available too in the Langtang valley, ranging from relatively easy-to-climb peaks around 5,000m high, such as Kyanjin Ri and Tsergo Ri, to technically challenging peaks, such as Dorje Lhakpa and Langtang Lirung.

2015 Nepal earthquake 
The village of Langtang was almost completely destroyed (1 building survived) by a massive avalanche caused by the April 2015 Nepal earthquake. The village suffered an estimated 310 deaths, including 176 Langtang residents, 80 foreigners, and 10 army personnel. More than 100 bodies were never recovered. Several other villages in upper Langtang valley were also destroyed. The Langtangpas who survived the destruction of the earthquake were evacuated by helicopter to Kathmandu, where a displaced persons camp was temporarily set up at the Yellow Gumba near Swayanmbhu. Many Langtangpas returned to the valley in the following months, and a significant amount of reconstruction was completed within the first year after the earthquake. By early 2018, the centuries-old gompa at Kyanjin Gompa, which had also been destroyed in the earthquake, had been rebuilt. The Swiss-cheese factory at Kyanjin Gompa village was destroyed too, but has been rebuilt and since then become operational again.

Climate change 
Since the mid-2010s, Langtangpas have noticed that most natural springs in the valley have gone dry. Scientists have attributed the reduction in the glacier area of the Langtang glacier directly to anthropogenic climate change since the 1970s. The intergovernmental organisation ICIMOD conducts periodic cryospheric research in the Langtang valley and Yala Glacier.

Langtang Himal 
Langtang Himal is a mountain range in the Himalayas which includes the following peaks:

See also
Langtang National Park
The earthquake of April 25, 2015 in Nepal
Path of the Mani

References 

Bagmati Province
Mountain ranges of Nepal